Jadwiga Andrzejewska (1915–1977) was a Polish film and theater actress who was popular between the World Wars in Poland and Germany.

Filmography
This filmography lists only most important movies:
 Milioner (1977)
 A jeśli będzie jesień... (1976)
 The Promised Land — Ziemia obiecana (1974)
 Motodrama (1971)
 150 na godzinę (1971)
 Znicz olimpijski (1969)
 Czterej pancerni i pies (1968)
 Ortalionowy dziadek (1968)
 Cyrograf dojrzałości (1967)
 Poradnik matrymonialny (1967)
 Wieczór przedświąteczny (1966)
 Niedziela sprawiedliwości (1965)
 The Ashes (1965)
 Mam tu swój dom (1963)
 Dom bez okien (1962)
 Rodzina Milcarków (1962)
 Czas przeszły (1961)
 Komedianty (1961)
 Nafta (1961)
 Lunatycy (1959)
 Miejsce na ziemi (1959)
 Miasteczko (1958)
 Koniec nocy (1956)
 Pożegnanie z diabłem (1956)
 Ziemia (film) (1956)
 Pod Gwiazdą Frygijską (1954)
 Wielka droga (1946, in Italy)
 Doktór Murek (1939)
 Zapomniana melodia (1938)
 Strachy (1938)
 Moi rodzice rozwodzą się (1938)
 Kobiety nad przepaścią (1938)
 Parada Warszawy (1937)
 Dziewczęta z Nowolipek (1937)
 Dorożkarz nr 13 (1937)
 Wierna rzeka (1936)
 Papa się żeni (1936)
 Ada! To nie wypada! (1936)
 30 karatów szczęścia (1936)
 Wacuś (1935)
 Wyrok życia (1933)
 Dzieje grzechu (1933)

External links

Knights of the Order of Polonia Restituta
Polish cabaret performers
Polish child actresses
Polish film actresses
Polish stage actresses
1915 births
1977 deaths
Film people from Łódź
Recipients of the Gold Cross of Merit (Poland)
20th-century Polish actresses
20th-century comedians